Sara Solá de Castellanos (pen name: Violeta del Valle; 23 June 1890after 1928) was an Argentine poet, novelist, playwright and lyricist. She is remembered for writing the lyrics of the hymn of the city of Salta. She was also the author of two extensive poems, Poemas del paisaje and Tiempo Añorado; a series of youth poems, novels and songs; and non-fiction works related to Salta.

Biography
Sara Liboria Solá Curth was born 23 June 1890 in Salta. Her parents were Manuel Solá Chavarría and Sara Curth Hidalgo. She had two brothers, Carlos Solá, and Miguel Solá, a historian, as well as one sister, Emma Solá, a poet. She was from one of the traditional families of her hometown.

Sola de Castellanos began publishing poetic compositions from a very young age in local newspapers and magazines, such as Caras y Caretas, signing with the pseudonym "Violeta del Valle". In 1923, she edited Elogio de la Vida Provinciana, which included her dramatic poem. She also composed theatrical works, among the most outstanding are: En los Tiempos Gloriosos, which premiered at the Victoria Theater in Salta in 1928 and Florilegio del Milagro y Santoral. She also composed novels, such as La Esposa del Oidor, for which she received distinctions at the Floral Games and by the Consejo Nacional de Mujeres del Argentina (National Council of Women of Argentina). She published in newspapers works of a historical nature on local issues and biographical essays on local characters or those linked to Salta's history. Sola de Castellanos was noted to be a feminist. She died in the City of Salta.

Selected works 
 Dios
 A la Virgen del Milagro
 Poemas del Paisaje 
 Gloria a Salta
 Tiempo Añorado
 Elogio de la Vida Provinciana
 En los Tiempos Gloriosos
 Florilegio del Milagro y Santoral
 La Esposa del Oidor

References

1890 births
20th-century Argentine writers
20th-century Argentine women writers
20th-century Argentine poets
20th-century Argentine novelists
20th-century pseudonymous writers
Argentine children's writers
Argentine non-fiction writers
20th-century Argentine historians
Argentine biographers
Argentine dramatists and playwrights
Argentine lyricists
Argentine feminists
People from Salta
Pseudonymous women writers
Year of death missing